Roman Hahun (born 16 July 1993) is a Ukrainian football defender.

Career
Hahun is a product of the FC Pansion youth sportive school in his native Shepetivka. In October 2020 he signed a contract with FC Rukh Lviv, that plays in the Ukrainian Premier League. In June 2022 he signed for Veres Rivne.

References

External links
Statistics at UAF website (Ukr)

1993 births
Living people
People from Shepetivka
Ukrainian footballers
Association football defenders
Ukrainian expatriate footballers
Expatriate footballers in Georgia (country)
Ukrainian expatriate sportspeople in Georgia (country)
FC Hoverla Uzhhorod players
FC Ahrobiznes Volochysk players
FC Rukh Lviv players
Ukrainian Premier League players
Ukrainian First League players
Ukrainian Second League players
Erovnuli Liga 2 players
Liga 3 (Georgia) players
Sportspeople from Khmelnytskyi Oblast